John Mockler (born 1866) was an Irish hurler who played for the Tipperary senior team.

Mockler was a member of the team for just one season during the 1887 championship. It was a successful season as he secured an All-Ireland medal that year. It was Tipperary's first All-Ireland title.

At club level Mockler enjoyed a long career with Moycarkey–Borris.

References

1866 births
Moycarkey-Borris hurlers
Tipperary inter-county hurlers
All-Ireland Senior Hurling Championship winners
Year of death missing